Wales Autism Research Centre (WARC) is a research centre within Cardiff University, Wales.  Focused on autism research, it collaborates with other university departments, the government and autism advocacy organizations. The center opened on 23 September 2010. Professor Sue Leekam is the Centre director and Cardiff University's Autism Chair.

Mission
The centre's mission is: "To create positive change for individuals and families affected with autism by
 advancing scientific research in areas of risk factors, early identification, diagnosis, cognitive development and intervention and
 working in partnership with practitioners, charities and the Welsh Assembly Government to integrate scientific evidence with policy and practice."

See also
Information about organisations that they collaborate with:
 Autism Cymru
 Autism Speaks
 Welsh Government

References

External links
 Official website: Wales Autism Research Centre (WARC)

Autism-related organisations in the United Kingdom
Cardiff University
2010 establishments in Wales
Organizations established in 2010